Last Blast of the Century is the sixth live album by Dutch hard rock band Golden Earring, released in 2000 (see 2000 in music). The album was not issued in the U.S.

Track listing
All songs written by Hay and Kooymans except where noted.

"Just Like Vince Taylor" – 4:01
"Heartbeat" (Gerritsen, Hay, Kooymans, Zuiderwijk) – 3:34
"Another 45 Miles" (Kooymans) – 3:29
"Long Blond Animal" – 4:56
"Liquid Soul" – 5:11
"The Fighter" – 7:41
"Hold Me Now" – 3:57
"Gambler's Blues" (Hay, Kooymans, E.H. Roelfzema) – 4:31
"Twilight Zone" (Kooymans) – 12:37
"Evil Love Chain" (Kooymans) – 5:01
"Take My Hand, Close My Eyes" – 5:46
"One Night Without You" – 4:19
"Paradise in Distress" – 5:43
"In a Bad Mood" – 6:00
"Making Love to Yourself" (Hay, Kooymans, Zuiderwijk) – 5:07
"Whisper in a Crowd" – 4:01
"Going to the Run" – 4:06
"Distant Love" (Gerritsen) – 6:18
"She Flies on Strange Wings" (Kooymans) – 7:16
"Burning Stuntman" – 6:16
"The Devil Made Me Do It" – 5:28
"Johnny Make Believe" – 4:51
"When the Lady Smiles" – 7:26
"Legalize Telepathy" (Hay, Kooymans, Roelfzema) – 4:20
"Radar Love" – 9:51
"I Can't Sleep Without You" – 6:45

Personnel
Rinus Gerritsen - bass
Barry Hay - vocals, guitar
George Kooymans - guitar, vocals
Cesar Zuiderwijk - drums

Additional personnel
Patricia Balrak - background vocals
Bertus Borgers - guest appearance
Wim Both - horn
Jan Oosting - horn
Jelle Schouten - horn
Secret Weapon - background vocals
Robert Jan Stips - guest appearance

Production
Producers: Golden Earring, John Sonneveld
Engineers: Golden Earring, John Sonneveld
Horn arrangements: Hans Hollestelle
Vocal director: Berget Lewis
Art direction: Barry Hay, Henk Schiffmacher
Photography: Kees Tabak

Charts

Weekly charts

Year-end charts

Certifications

References

Golden Earring live albums
2000 live albums